Mandazi is a form of fried bread that originated on the Swahili Coast. It is also known as bofrot or puff puff in Western African countries such as Ghana and Nigeria. It is one of the principal dishes in the cuisine of the Swahili people who inhabit the Coastal Region of Kenya and Tanzania. The dish is popular in the region, as it is convenient to make, can be eaten with almost any food or dips or just as a snack by itself, and can be saved and reheated for later consumption.

Characteristics
Mandazi are similar to doughnuts, having a more of a sweet taste which can be differentiated with the addition of different ingredients. However, they are typically less sweet than the United States style of doughnuts and are usually served without any glazing or frosting. They are frequently made triangular in shape (similar to samosas), but are also commonly shaped as circles or ovals. When cooked, they have a fluffy texture.

Preparation

Mandazi are made by briefly cooking the dough in cooking oil. The ingredients typically used to make mandazi include water, sugar, flour, yeast, and milk. Coconut milk is also commonly added for sweetness. When coconut milk is added, mandazi are commonly referred to as mahamri or mamri. Ground peanuts and almonds, among other ingredients, can also be used to add a different flavor. After being cooked, they can be eaten warm or left to cool down. They are popular in the African Great Lakes region, as they can be eaten in accompaniment with many things. They are commonly made in the morning or the night before, eaten with breakfast, then re-heated in the evening for dinner. Mandazi are also commonly eaten with tea or fresh fruit juice, or are eaten as snacks by themselves. Different dips, often fruit flavored, can be used to add various tastes. Mandazi can also be eaten as a dessert after a meal where it is often served with powdered or cinnamon sugar to add sweetness.

See also

 Beignet, a similar pastry from New Orleans
 List of fried dough foods
 Ox-tongue pastry, a similar Chinese pastry

References

Breads
Somali cuisine
Kenyan cuisine
Tanzanian cuisine
South Sudanese cuisine
Ethiopian cuisine
Ugandan cuisine
Deep fried foods
Doughnuts